Byers Green railway station was one of three railway stations that served in the village of Byers Green in County Durham, Northeast England.

History
Passengers were first carried from 1845, initially starting at Tod Hills (or Todhills) to the west, but services were cut back to Byers Green from 1848. The service was again extended to Tod Hills in 1865, before the passenger service was withdrawn on the branch in 1867.

The service was restored in 1878, when a new Byers Green station opened at the site of the original Tod Hills station. This station closed to passengers on 4 December 1939 and goods on 2 June 1958.

The Clarence Railway was leased to the Stockton and Hartlepool Railway for 21 years from 1844, and a permanent lease was negotiated from 1851. The Clarence Railway became part of the West Hartlepool Harbour and Railway in 1853, which became part of the larger North Eastern Railway in 1865.

The trackbed of the railway has been converted into the Auckland Way, a path for walkers and cyclists.

References

Sources

Further reading

External links

Disused railway stations in County Durham
Former North Eastern Railway (UK) stations
Railway stations in Great Britain opened in 1837
Railway stations in Great Britain closed in 1939
Spennymoor